The Parliamentary Secretary to the Board of Trade in the United Kingdom was a member of Parliament assigned to assist the Board of Trade and its President with administration and liaison with Parliament. It replaced the Vice-President of the Board of Trade.

From September 1953, a more senior ministerial post, the Minister of State for Trade also existed. At times, the Parliamentary Secretary post was then filled by a member of the House of Lords.

On 20 October 1970, the Board of Trade was merged with the Ministry of Technology to create the modern Department of Trade and Industry. The role of Parliamentary Secretary to the Board of Trade therefore ceased to have practical application beyond that date. The closest successor can be found in the role of Parliamentary Secretary to the Department of Trade and Industry.

Past Parliamentary Secretaries to the Board of Trade

 1868–1871 George Shaw-Lefevre
 1871–1874 Arthur Wellesley Peel
 1874–1875 George Cavendish-Bentinck
 1875–1878 Edward Stanhope
 1878–1880 John Gilbert Talbot
 1880–1882 Evelyn Ashley
 1882–1885 John Holms
 1885–1888 Baron Henry de Worms
 1888–1889 Earl of Onslow
 1889–1892 The Lord Balfour of Burleigh
 1892–1895 Thomas Burt
 1895–1902 The Earl of Dudley
 1902–1905 Bonar Law
 1905-1909 Hudson Kearley
 1909–1911 Harold Tennant
 1911–1915 John M. Robertson
 1915–1916 E. G. Pretyman
 1916–1917 George Henry Roberts
 1917–1919 George Wardle
 1919–1920 William Bridgeman
 1920–1921 Philip Lloyd-Graeme
 1921–1922 William Mitchell-Thomson
 1922–1924 Viscount Wolmer
 1924-1924 A. V. Alexander
 1924–1928 Sir Robert Burton-Chadwick
 1928–1929 Herbert Williams
 1929–1931 Walter Robert Smith
 1931-1931 Gwilym Lloyd George
 1931–1932 Leslie Hore-Belisha
 1931–1937 Leslie Burgin
 1937–1938 Euan Wallace
 1938–1939 Ronald Cross
 1939–1941 Gwilym Lloyd George
 1941–1945 Charles Waterhouse
 1945–1946 Ellis Smith
 1946–1949 John Belcher
 1949–1950 John Edwards
 1950–1951 Hervey Rhodes
 1951–1955 Henry Strauss
 1955-1955 Donald Kaberry
 1955–1956 Derek Walker-Smith
 1956–1958 Frederick Erroll
 1958–1960 John Rodgers
 1960–1962 Niall Macpherson
 1962–1964 David Price
 1964–1967 Lord Rhodes
 1967-1967 Lord Walston
 1967–1970 Gwyneth Dunwoody
 1970 Anthony Grant
Lists of government ministers of the United Kingdom
Defunct ministerial offices in the United Kingdom